Sanjay Seth is an Indian politician from UP, not to be confused with the Ranchi politician of the same name. He was elected to the Rajya Sabha, the upper house of the Parliament of India from Uttar Pradesh as a member of the Samajwadi Party in 2016. He has served as the Co-Vice President of the Uttar Pradesh Olympic Association (Affiliated to the Indian Olympic Association), as vice-president of the Uttar Pradesh Badminton Association (Affiliated to Badminton Association of India) and as President of the Confederation of Real Estate Developers' Association of India (CREDAI), Uttar Pradesh region. Seth joined Bharatiya Janta Party on 10 August 2019.

Early life 
Seth was born in Lucknow, Uttar Pradesh to Lavkush Narain Seth and Kusum Seth on 10 February 1961. Seth holds a bachelor's degree in commerce (B. Com) from University of Lucknow.

Professional life 

Seth is one of the co-founders of Shalimar Corp Limited. Due to his experience and success in the real estate industry, he was elected as the president of the Confederation of Real Estate Developers' Association of India (CREDAI), Uttar Pradesh Region.

Political career 

An active member of the Rajya Sabha, Seth was appointed to the Parliamentary Committee on Water Resources (July 2016-Aug 2017). He also served on the Committee on Subordinate Legislation from September 2016 to June 2018. He is currently serving as a member on the Committee on Industry (since September 2017) and the Railway Convention Committee (since June 2018).

Seth joined Bharatiya Janta Party on 10 August 2019.

Personal life 
Seth is married to Leena Seth. They have a son and a daughter.

References

1961 births
Living people
Bharatiya Janata Party politicians from Uttar Pradesh
Rajya Sabha members from Uttar Pradesh
Businesspeople from Lucknow
Politicians from Lucknow
Members of the Parliament of India